Ebru Şahin Osman (born 18 May 1994) is a Turkish actress and model. She made her cinematic debut with the movie Kan Parası and had a brief role in the TV show İstanbullu Gelin. She rose to prominence with her role as Reyyan Şadoğlu on the Turkish drama Hercai.

Career 

Şahin is a graduate of Istanbul University with a degree in Sports Sciences, after which she started taking acting lessons. She made her cinematic debut in 2016 with a role in the movie Kan Parası. She made her television debut in 2017 with a supporting role in the TV series Savaşçı. After being cast in other supporting roles in İstanbullu Gelin and Yasak Elma between 2017–2018, she had her first leading role in the TV series Hercai as Reyyan Şadoğlu. For this role, she was awarded a Golden Butterfly Award as Best Actress in 2020.

Filmography

Television

Awards and nominations

References

External links 
 
 

1994 births
Living people
Turkish television actresses
Istanbul University alumni
Actresses from Istanbul
Golden Butterfly Award winners